Luca Curatoli (born 25 July 1994) is an Italian left-handed sabre fencer, 2015 team world champion, and 2021 team Olympic silver medalist.

Career
Curatoli is the half-brother of 1995 sabre world champion Raffaello Caserta and of Leonardo Caserta, who coaches him at Circolo Posillipo. In 2014 he won the gold medal at the Junior European Championships in Jerusalem and took a double gold haul at the Junior World Championships in Plovdiv.

In the 2014-15 season he climbed his first World Cup podium with a bronze medal in Warsaw. These results had him selected into the Italian senior national team, with whom he was silver medallist at the 2015 European Championships. At the 2015 World Fencing Championships, his first participation in this type of event, he achieved the best Italian performance in men's sabre by reaching the table of 16, where he was defeated by reigning Olympic champion Áron Szilágyi. In the team event, Italy prevailed successively over the Czech Republic, Mexico, Romania and France to reach the final, where they met host Russia. Curatoli was chosen to open the match against Nikolay Kovalev and hold his stead in his following relays, helping his team to win the gold medal.

Medal Record

Olympic Games

World Championship

European Championship

Grand Prix

World Cup

References

External links
 
  Luca Curatoli at the Italian Fencing Federation

Italian male fencers
Italian sabre fencers
1994 births
Living people
Fencers from Naples
Fencers of Fiamme Oro
Olympic fencers of Italy
Fencers at the 2020 Summer Olympics
Medalists at the 2020 Summer Olympics
Olympic medalists in fencing
Olympic silver medalists for Italy
21st-century Italian people
World Fencing Championships medalists